Catastrophe is a British television sitcom first broadcast on 19 January 2015 on Channel 4. It is created, written by, and stars Sharon Horgan and Rob Delaney, who portray single people who become a couple after she unexpectedly becomes pregnant following a fling while he is visiting London on a business trip. Carrie Fisher, Ashley Jensen and Mark Bonnar play supporting characters in the series.

The show was renewed for a second series in January 2015 and began broadcasting from 27 October 2015, having been brought forward from its original schedule of early 2016. In July 2016, Catastrophe was renewed for a third and fourth series. The third series, which began broadcasting in the UK on 28 February 2017, comprises 6 episodes — which all became available in the United States on 28 April 2017, hosted by Amazon. The fourth and final series of the show began broadcasting on 8 January 2019; premiering on March 15, 2019, in the US.

For her performance in the show, Sharon Horgan was nominated for a BAFTA Award for Best Female Comedy Performance in 2016. Both Horgan and Delaney won the BAFTA TV Award for Best Writer: Comedy. The show was nominated for a Peabody Award. In July 2016, the show received a Primetime Emmy Award nomination for Outstanding Writing For a Comedy Series for Horgan and Delaney.

Synopsis
Irish primary school teacher Sharon is single and lives in London. She meets single American advertising executive Rob in a bar whilst he is visiting London on a business trip. They have a six-day fling and he returns to his home town, Boston. She discovers that she is pregnant by him. After she informs him of that, he moves to London and they become a couple. They marry shortly before she gives birth to their son. They later have a daughter.

Cast

Main
 Sharon Horgan as Sharon Morris
 Rob Delaney as Rob Norris

Recurring
 Ashley Jensen as Fran, Sharon's frenemy
 Mark Bonnar as Chris, Fran's husband
 Carrie Fisher as Mia Norris, Rob's mother (series 1–3)
 Frances Tomelty as Carol Morris, Sharon's mother
 Gary Lilburn as Des Morris, Sharon's father (series 1–3)
 Jonathan Forbes as Fergal Morris, Sharon's brother
 Daniel Lapaine as Dave, Rob's friend
 Eileen Walsh as Kate, Sharon's friend.
 Tobias Menzies as Dr. Harries
 Sarah Niles as Melissa, Sharon's co-worker
 Marta Barrio as Mallandra, Fergal's wife
 Seeta Indrani as Harita
 Emmanuelle Bouaziz as Olivia
 Amanda Hale as Catherine, Dave's girlfriend
 Lauren Socha as Anna
 Kai Alexander as Jeffrey, Fran & Chris's son (series 3–4)
 Michaela Watkins as Sydney Norris, Rob's sister (series 4)

Production and broadcast
The series was officially commissioned by Channel 4 in May 2014 after a successful pilot the previous year. The BBC had previously turned down the series after reading the script.

Catastrophe was named after the following quotation from the movie Zorba the Greek. "I'm a man, so I married. Wife, children, house, everything. The full catastrophe."

The original theme for the series, "Catastrophe Theme", was composed by Oli Julian.

On 28 January 2015, the show was renewed for a second series, which aired in October 2015. Jay Hunt, Channel 4's chief creative officer, said: "Catastrophe is a real comedy gem. Sharon and Rob have done a magnificent job and we're already looking forward to series two".

Carrie Fisher, who plays Mia, died on 27 December 2016 shortly after filming of series 3 of Catastrophe had concluded. This was her final TV role. The final episode of series 3 is dedicated to her, with the simple words "For Carrie" appearing on screen alongside a photograph of Fisher following the credits.

Series 4 was filmed in 2018 and was the series' last.

For series 4, production visited Beacon House in Whitstable, Kent, which doubled as a house in Boston, and was used for the filming of Mia's (Carrie Fisher) funeral. Another location in Whitstable which featured in the filming was The Lobster Shack. The Pantiles in Royal Tunbridge Wells also featured and doubled as Boston.

Episodes

Series 1 (2015)

Series 2 (2015)

Series 3 (2017)

Series 4 (2019)

Broadcast
The series was first broadcast in the UK on Channel 4 from January 2015. In the United States, the series is shown exclusively on Amazon Prime Instant Video, with the first series added in June 2015. It will be made available to subscribers in the United Kingdom later in the year. Amazon Studios vice president Roy Price said: "Rob and Sharon have created an engaging, contemporary, funny and moving story. We are excited to bring Catastrophe exclusively to our Amazon Prime customers, and can't wait to hear what they think of the series." The show has also been sold to numerous other countries. In Australia it is shown on Australian Broadcasting Corporation, in Canada it ran on Shomi until the video on demand service ceased operation, and in New Zealand on SoHo.

Accolades

References

External links
 
 
 
 

2015 British television series debuts
2019 British television series endings
2010s British sex comedy television series
2010s British sitcoms
Casual sex in television
Channel 4 sitcoms
English-language television shows
Pregnancy-themed television shows
Television series about dysfunctional families
Television series about marriage
Television series created by Sharon Horgan
Television shows set in London